Beenox Inc. is a Canadian video game developer established in 2000 in Quebec City, Quebec, Canada. The studio became a wholly owned subsidiary of Activision on May 25, 2005.

History
Between 2003 and 2006, the developer was essentially a porting house. They completed approximately 30 projects for Microsoft Windows and Macintosh operating systems, based on popular franchises such as X-Men, Spider-Man and Shrek.

In 2006, they returned to original game development with the console versions of Bee Movie Game, inspired by the feature film from DreamWorks Animation. As part of Activision's E3 2007 media blitz, it was announced that Beenox was the developer behind the Windows version of Activision's Spider-Man game Spider-Man: Friend or Foe, which was released in October 2007. They released the Xbox 360, PlayStation 2, PlayStation 3, Wii and Windows versions of Monsters vs. Aliens and the console versions of Guitar Hero Smash Hits. Beenox later developed the Spider-Man games Spider-Man: Shattered Dimensions, Spider-Man: Edge of Time, The Amazing Spider-Man and The Amazing Spider-Man 2.

After founder Dominique Brown's departure in December 2012, the studio's focus shifted from leading original game development to doing a number of support tasks on Activision's superbrands Skylanders and Call of Duty. In 2015, Beenox worked in conjunction with Mercenary Technology on bringing Call of Duty: Black Ops III to PlayStation 3 and Xbox 360.

In March 2022, Beenox announced that it would open a second office in Montréal, Quebec, increasing its staff count by 20%. Polloni will lead the new studio.

Games developed

Ports

References

External links
 
 
 
 

Activision
Companies based in Quebec City
Canadian companies established in 2000
Video game companies established in 2000
Video game companies of Canada
Video game development companies
2000 establishments in Quebec
2005 mergers and acquisitions
Canadian subsidiaries of foreign companies